Nadine Marejke Angerer (born 10 November 1978) is a German football coach and player who is the goalkeeping player-coach for Portland Thorns of the National Women's Soccer League (NWSL).

Angerer has played for Frauen-Bundesliga clubs Bayern Munich, Turbine Potsdam (with whom she won the 2005 UEFA Women's Cup) and FFC Frankfurt. In 2008, she played for Djurgårdens IF of the Swedish Damallsvenskan and she spent two periods on loan with Brisbane Roar of the Australian W-League in 2013 and 2014. During her extensive international career, Angerer was recognised as one of the world's best female goalkeepers.

Since making her debut for the Germany women's national football team in August 1996, Angerer won a total of 146 caps. She understudied Silke Rottenberg at the UEFA Women's Championship in 1997, 2001 and 2005; the FIFA Women's World Cup in 1999 and 2003; as well as the 2000 and 2004 Olympic football tournaments. When Rottenberg was injured before the 2007 FIFA Women's World Cup, Angerer took over as first choice and kept a clean sheet in every round as Germany won the tournament. She remained first choice for the 2009 and 2013 editions of the UEFA Women's Championship, the 2011 and 2015 FIFA Women's World Cups and the 2008 Olympics.

Germany won the UEFA Women's Championship on each of the five occasions Angerer was involved and won the FIFA Women's World Cup in 2003 and 2007. Their best finish at the Olympics was third in 2000, 2004 and 2008. Angerer is a penalty-saving specialist, having stopped Marta's kick in the 2007 FIFA Women's World Cup Final and both Trine Rønning and Solveig Gulbrandsen's during the UEFA Women's Euro 2013 Final. She was appointed captain of Germany in 2011 following the retirement of Birgit Prinz. On 13 January 2014, Angerer was named FIFA World Player of the Year, becoming the first goalkeeper – male or female – to win the award. She announced her retirement from the international team on 13 May 2015.

Club career
Angerer was born in Lohr am Main, near Frankfurt. Her career began with ASV Hofstetten, where she played as a forward. When she substituted for the injured goalkeeper during a youth scouting game, she was discovered as a goalkeeping talent. In 1995, she moved to 1. FC Nürnberg and one year later to FC Wacker München. While at Wacker, she rejected the opportunity to play for an American college soccer team.

From 1999 to 2001, Angerer played at FC Bayern Munich, helping the team achieve promotion to Germany's top division, the Bundesliga. She transferred to 1. FFC Turbine Potsdam in 2001, where she claimed two national Bundesliga championships, three German Cup wins and the UEFA Women's Cup in the 2004–05 season.

After seven years at Potsdam, Angerer left Germany in 2008 to play at Djurgårdens IF Dam in Sweden, replacing Bente Nordby. She returned to Germany after only one season to join 1. FFC Frankfurt. She won the German Cup for a fourth time with Frankfurt in 2011. Following Birgit Prinz's retirement she was appointed Frankfurt's new captain.

While playing at the UEFA Women's Euro 2013 Angerer announced her signing on a free transfer with the Brisbane Roar in Australia's W-League and further plans for a move to an as yet unspecified team in the NWSL by January 2014.

Portland Thorns FC
On 13 January 2014, Portland Thorns FC announced Angerer's acquisition to play for Portland for the National Women's Soccer League 2014 Season, replacing Karina LeBlanc who was traded to the Chicago Red Stars. She made her debut for Portland with a shutout against the Houston Dash on 12 April and went on to start 22 games for the Thorns, adding another three saves while compiling 74 saves (both ranking fourth in the league). After the season, Angerer was loaned to the Brisbane Roar with plans to return to Portland for the start of the 2015 season.

Angerer retired from being a professional footballer in 2015.

On 17 July 2020, Angerer was signed as an emergency replacement goalkeeper by Portland Thorns FC during the 2020 NWSL Challenge Cup.

International career

Angerer made her international debut for Germany against the Netherlands in August 1996. However, after five matches in quick succession she was only used sporadically thereafter. Angerer was Germany's second choice goalkeeper behind Silke Rottenberg for almost a decade, winning six major titles as a reserve player without having played in a single game, including the 2003 FIFA Women's World Cup, two Olympic bronze medals in 2000, 2004, and three UEFA European Championships in 1997, 2001 and 2005.

When Rottenberg suffered an anterior cruciate ligament injury, Angerer was picked as the starting goalkeeper for the 2007 FIFA Women's World Cup. During the entire tournament she did not concede a single goal, setting the record for most consecutive minutes played without conceding a goal in World Cup play to 540 minutes. This included blocking a penalty kick by Marta in the 2–0 final win over Brazil. Along with Norway's Bente Nordby, she was named in FIFA's tournament All-Star Team.

Angerer remained Germany's national team goalkeeper for the 2008 Summer Olympics, claiming the bronze medal. She won the European Championship for a fourth time in 2009, the first time she had been a starter for Germany. Angerer was called up for the 2011 FIFA Women's World Cup squad and received her 100th cap in her team's second match of the tournament, against Nigeria.

Following Birgit Prinz's retirement Angerer was appointed the national team's new captain. She saved penalty kicks from both Trine Rønning and Solveig Gulbrandsen during the UEFA Women's Euro 2013 final at Friends Arena on 28 July 2013, and was named player of the match following Germany's 1–0 win against Norway. Anja Mittag's goal gave the Germans their sixth successive title.

In May 2015, Angerer was named to Germany's roster for the 2015 FIFA Women's World Cup in Canada. During a quarter-final match against France, she denied Claire Lavogez who took the crucial fifth penalty during the penalty shootout to clinch the win and advance to the semi-finals against the United States. Germany lost the semi-final 2–0 to the United States after Carli Lloyd scored a penalty and Kelley O'Hara added a second goal. In Angerer's final game with the national team she was beaten by another penalty, despite her angry protests. Fara Williams gave England a 1–0 extra time win in the bronze medal match.

Coaching career

Portland Thorns FC

On 2 December 2015, Angerer was announced as the goalkeeper coach for the Portland Thorns.

Personal life
After abandoning an apprenticeship as an event technician, Angerer trained as a physiotherapist and took a break from the national team in 2006–07 to complete her exams. Angerer told the German newspaper Die Zeit in December 2010 that she does not discriminate on grounds of gender when considering personal relationships.

Angerer married Magdalena ( Golombek) in November 2016.

Honours

Club
Turbine Potsdam
 UEFA Women's Cup: 2004–05
 Bundesliga: 2003–04, 2005–06
 German Cup: 2003–04, 2004–05, 2005–06

1. FFC Frankfurt
 German Cup: 2010–11

International
 FIFA World Cup: 2003, 2007
 UEFA European Football Championship: 1997, 2001, 2005, 2009, 2013
 Olympic bronze medal: 2000, 2004, 2008
 Algarve Cup: 2006, 2014

Individual
 FIFA Women's World Cup All-Star Team: 2007, 2015
 FIFA Women's World Cup Best Goalkeeper: 2007
 Silbernes Lorbeerblatt
 UEFA Women's Euro Squad of the Tournament: 2013
 UEFA Women's Euro Best Player of the Tournament: 2013
 UEFA Best Women's Player in Europe Award: 2013
 FIFA World Player of the Year: 2013
 IFFHS UEFA Woman Team of the Decade 2011–2020

See also

 List of German women's football champions
 List of Olympic medalists in football
 Football in Germany

References

External links

 Official homepage  
 Profile  at DFB 
 Player German domestic football stats  at DFB
 
 
 

1978 births
Living people
1. FFC Frankfurt players
1. FFC Turbine Potsdam players
Portland Thorns FC players
1999 FIFA Women's World Cup players
2003 FIFA Women's World Cup players
2007 FIFA Women's World Cup players
2011 FIFA Women's World Cup players
2015 FIFA Women's World Cup players
FIFA Women's World Cup-winning players
Bisexual sportspeople
Expatriate women's footballers in Sweden
Expatriate women's soccer players in Australia
Expatriate women's soccer players in the United States
Brisbane Roar FC (A-League Women) players
FC Bayern Munich (women) players
FIFA Century Club
Footballers at the 2000 Summer Olympics
Footballers at the 2004 Summer Olympics
Footballers at the 2008 Summer Olympics
German women's footballers
German expatriate women's footballers
Germany women's international footballers
German LGBT footballers
Olympic footballers of Germany
Olympic bronze medalists for Germany
Olympic medalists in football
LGBT association football players
Bisexual women
Medalists at the 2008 Summer Olympics
FIFA World Player of the Year winners
Nadine Angerer
German physiotherapists
Medalists at the 2004 Summer Olympics
Medalists at the 2000 Summer Olympics
German expatriate sportspeople in Sweden
German expatriate sportspeople in Australia
German expatriate sportspeople in the United States
National Women's Soccer League players
Women's association football goalkeepers
Association football goalkeepers
UEFA Women's Championship-winning players
Damallsvenskan players
Portland Thorns FC non-playing staff
People from Lohr am Main
Sportspeople from Lower Franconia
Footballers from Bavaria